Aureopterix micans is a moth of the family Micropterigidae. It is known from dense rainforest throughout New Caledonia from Mount Panié to the Rivière Bleue.

Adults have been found between mid-October and the end of January.

The forewing ground colour is pale shining silvery ochreous, with rich bronzy brown fasciae, more clearly marked in the female than in the male. There are a few brown scales on the costa at the base, with a line of brown scales along the costa to an interrupted basal line running obliquely inwards and consisting of a costal patch at one-fifth, a small spot in the middle and a larger patch toward the jugal area. There is a strong, continuous, slightly oblique transverse line at mid-length, slightly concave along its inner margin and expanding a little at each end. There is also an area of brown scales in the apex, it is darkest along the costa and grading to paler bronze on the termen and at the apex. The fringes are long and pale silvery ochreous grading to pale bronzy brown along the anal curvature in the female, with zones of brown scales marking the fascia on the costa. The hindwing is very pale bronzy brown. The fringes are bronzy brown.

Etymology
The species name is derived from Latin micans (meaning gleaming, with a metallic lustre) to refer to the pale-coloured reflective surface of the wings.

References

External links

Aureopterix micans on The Praise of Insects Blogpost

Micropterigidae
Moths described in 2010
Endemic fauna of New Caledonia
Moths of Oceania